Crazy Cottage is a children's game show that aired on ITV from 4 April 1996 to 29 May 1998. It was hosted by Rick Adams for the first series, until he was replaced by Jez Edwards for the next two series. A puppet cuckoo called Vera was voiced by Steve Nallon. The gimmick of the show was that most things had to be performed backwards.

The show started with the presenter saying "goodbye", then starting the games at Round 5. One of the rounds involved a series of actions that had to be performed in a certain order, so that when it was played back in reverse, it matched what they were asked to do. Another round was a kitchen set up on a slope, but appeared to the viewers as a normal room.

At the end of the programme, the winning team (who had the fewest points) won a prize, such as a trip to Alton Towers. The losing team (with the most points) would win a backwards invention, for example, a black lightbulb.

Transmissions

References

External links
 
 
 

1996 British television series debuts
1998 British television series endings
1990s British children's television series
British children's game shows
British television shows featuring puppetry
ITV children's television shows
Television series by ITV Studios
Carlton Television